Loose Buttons are a New York City-based indie rock band. Its members include Eric Nizgretsky (singer), Zack Kantor (lead guitar), Manny Silverstein (bass), and Adam Holtzberg (drums). It has released two Albums: Something Better (2020) and What's On Outside (2021) as well as two EPs: Sundays (2017) and Damage Gallery (2014).

References

External links

Indie rock musical groups from New York (state)
Musical groups from New York City